Joseph Earl Lawther (February 11, 1876 – April 24, 1943) was an American banker. He  was mayor of Dallas in 1917–1919.

Biography
Lawther was born February 11, 1876, in Galveston, Texas to Robert Ralston Lawther and Ellen E. Hoopes. He married Irma Bernice Enlow, daughter of James H. Enlow and Harriett Campbell, on October 22, 1895, in Dallas, Texas. They had two children: Margaret and Lynn V.  After the death of his first wife in 1924, he married Anna Florence Walden, daughter of Charles Joe Walden and Eola Betty Tedford on June 8, 1925, in Jackson County, Missouri. They had one child: Jo Ann.

He entered the business world in the grain business, Lawther & Son, the firm of his father. He became president of Liberty State Bank and was responsible for its growth.  He also served as president of Guardian Federal Savings & Loan Association. He assisted the Dallas Athletic Club to increase membership and decrease indebtedness.  He was recognized for the improvement of White Rock Lake when a road around it was named for him.

He was a member of the Masonic Lodge, the Dallas Historical Society, and the Dallas Athletic Club.

On  April 24, 1943, Joe Lawther died at Dallas, Texas. He was interred at Grove Hill Cemetery, Dallas, Texas.

References

1876 births
1943 deaths
Mayors of Dallas